Keyfitz may refer to:
Nathan Keyfitz (1913–2010), Canadian demographer
Barbara Keyfitz,  Canadian-American mathematician